In general relativity, a black brane is a solution of the equations that generalizes a black hole solution but it is also extended—and translationally symmetric—in p additional spatial dimensions. That type of solution would be called a black p-brane.

In string theory, the term black brane describes a group of D1-branes that are surrounded by a horizon. With the notion of a horizon in mind as well as identifying points as zero-branes, a generalization of a black hole is a black p-brane. However, many physicists tend to define a black brane separate from a black hole, making the distinction that the singularity of a black brane is not a point like a black hole, but instead a higher dimensional object.

A BPS black brane is similar to a BPS black hole. They both have electric charges. Some BPS black branes have magnetic charges.

The metric for a black p-brane in a n-dimensional spacetime is:

where:
η is the (p + 1)-Minkowski metric with signature (−, +, +, +, ...),
σ are the coordinates for the worldsheet of the black p-brane,
u is its four-velocity,
r is the radial coordinate and,
Ω is the metric for a (n − p − 2)-sphere, surrounding the brane.

Curvatures 
When .

The Ricci Tensor becomes , .

The Ricci Scalar becomes .

Where ,  are the Ricci Tensor and Ricci scalar of the metric .

Black string

A black string is a higher dimensional (D>4) generalization of a black hole in which the event horizon is topologically equivalent to S2 × S1 and spacetime is asymptotically Md−1 × S1.

Perturbations of black string solutions were found to be unstable for L (the length around S1) greater than some threshold L′.  The full non-linear evolution of a black string beyond this threshold might result in a black string breaking up into separate black holes which would coalesce into a single black hole.  This scenario seems unlikely because it was realized a black string could not pinch off in finite time, shrinking S2 to a point and then evolving to some Kaluza–Klein black hole.  When perturbed, the black string would settle into a stable, static non-uniform black string state.

Kaluza–Klein black hole
A Kaluza–Klein black hole is a black brane (generalisation of a black hole) in asymptotically flat Kaluza–Klein space, i.e. higher-dimensional spacetime with compact dimensions. They may also be called KK black holes.

See also 

 AdS black hole

References

Bibliography

Black holes